Robert Leckey is the current Dean of the McGill University Faculty of Law where he is also a full professor.

Education
Robert Leckey graduated from Queen's University with a B.A.H. in English literature in 1997 and from McGill Law in 2002, where he served as Editor-in-Chief of the McGill Law Journal. After graduation he was a clerk to Justice Michel Bastarache at the Supreme Court of Canada. He then graduated from his S.J.D. from the University of Toronto Faculty of Law, where he was a Trudeau Scholar.

Career
Leckey is known for his work in family law, specifically his work on the subject of same-sex equality under the family law and legal system of Canada. He is an active supporter of LGBT rights in Quebec and has made open statements against government policies that affect LGBT communities negatively. He has also provided arguments that try to poke holes in modern family law ethics, such as the concept of divorce. Leckey has worked in the field of human rights law

In 2009 he was awarded the John W. Durnford Prize for Teaching Excellence and le Prix d'essai juridique for his legal scholarship.  In 2010 he was awarded the Canada Prize for his 2008 book Contextual Subjects: Family, State and Relational Theory, a national book award given only once every four years. In 2015, Leckey became a full professor. In 2016, he was named to the Samuel Gale Chair. On July 1, 2016, he began a five-year term as dean of the McGill Faculty of Law. From 2014 to 2016, Leckey was the director of the Paul-André Crépeau Centre for Private and Comparative Law. From 2008 to 2011, he chaired the McGill Equity Subcommittee on Queer People.

In 2022, Leckey was strongly criticized in his position as Dean regarding the Faculty of Law's lack of measures to counter the spread of COVID-19. He referred to a student strike, initiated by referendum, as a "boycott" and insisted that he cannot mandate measures in classes due to professorial independence. Nonetheless, he has opposed professorial unionization on the grounds that law professors should not form a bargaining unit separate from other professors at McGill.

References

External links

Living people
Academic staff of the McGill University Faculty of Law
University of Toronto Faculty of Law alumni
Canadian LGBT rights activists
McGill University Faculty of Law alumni
Year of birth missing (living people)
McGill Law Journal editors